Nathan André Barnwell (born 3 February 2003) is an English cricketer who plays for Surrey County Cricket Club. He is a right-handed batsman and right arm medium bowler.

Personal life
He had begun playing backyard cricket with his father and siblings. He is a fan of Crystal Palace. Barnwell attended Caterham School and played cricket as part of the Surrey pathway since under-9 level.

Career
Barnwell was given a rookie contract with Surrey in October 2021. He made List A debut on 10 August 2022 in the Royal London One-Day Cup against Middlesex at Radlett.

International career
Barnwell made his debut for England U19s in September 2021 against the West Indies U19s. He was named in the England squad for the 2022 ICC Under-19 Cricket World Cup held in the West Indies.

References

External Links

Living people
2003 births
Surrey cricketers
People from Ashford, Kent